"As Time Goes" is a song recorded by South Korean singer Jinsoul for the soundtrack of the drama series Welcome. It was released as a digital single on April 15, 2020, by Donuts Music N and Dreamus.

Lyrics
"As Time Goes" was composed by Jay Lee who wrote songs for Hotel Del Luna and Secret Mother. He said in an interview that "Jinsoul's sad/melancholy voice would stimulate the listeners' emotions."

Track listing

Commercial Performance
The song reached number one on iTunes in 30 countries including Turkey, Singapore, Saudi Arabia, The Philippines, Finland, Chile, Vietnam, Malaysia, Colombia, Argentina, Thailand, Brazil and Mexico. The song also debuted at number two on Billboard's World Digital Songs Sale Chart.

Charts

References 

2020 songs
2020 singles
Korean-language songs
South Korean television drama theme songs